Ceramic membranes are a type of artificial membranes made from inorganic materials (such as alumina, titania, zirconia oxides, silicon carbide or some glassy materials). They are used in membrane operations for liquid filtration.

By contrast with polymeric membranes, they can be used in separations where aggressive media (acids, strong solvents) are present. They also have excellent thermal stability which makes them usable in high-temperature membrane operations.

Like polymeric membranes, they are either dense or porous.

Configurations include tubular cross flow and dead-end membranes as well as flat sheet membranes.

Dense membranes
Dense ceramic membranes are used for the purpose of gas separation. Examples are the separation of oxygen from air, or the separation of hydrogen gas from a mixture.

Porous membranes
Porous ceramic membranes are chiefly used for gas separation and micro- or nanofiltration. They can be made from both crystalline as well as amorphous solids.

An example of an amorphous membrane is the silica membrane.

An example of a highly porous membrane is the type made of silicon carbide.

History & manufacturers of ceramic membranes
The first ceramic membranes were produced in France in the 1980s for the purpose of uranium enrichment in the nuclear industry. After many of the nuclear plants were set up in France other industrial application areas for the ceramic membranes were sought out.
At the same time academic research on ceramic membranes was conducted. The leading group was directed by Professor Louis Cot at the National Graduate School of Chemistry in Montpellier. The group growth gave rise to the creation of a laboratory fully dedicated to the membrane materials and processes from 1994
and to the European Membrane Institute of Montpellier in 2000.
French manufacturers of ceramic membranes include Orelis Environnement (Alsys group), Pall Exekia and Tami Industries. Other companies outside France include CoorsTek (http://www.coorstek.com), Atech (http://www.atech-innovations.com), Inopor, Jiangsu Jiuwu, Meidensha, MetaWater, Liqtech, and Mantec Technical Ceramics Ltd (http://www.mantectechnicalceramics.com/products-services/porous-ceramics/filtration/star-sep-membranes/elements)

While most of the ceramic membrane manufacturers produce the membranes of carriers and membrane layers of alumina oxide, titanium oxide and zirconia oxide only a few manufacturers work with silicon carbide. Silicon carbide requires higher sintering temperatures (>2000 °C) compared to oxide based membranes (1200-1600 °C). The pioneers in developing and commercializing silicon carbide membranes are the Danish company Liqtech, CeraMem (Alsys group) and American company Kemco Systems.

References

Membrane technology